Asterolasia hexapetala is a species of erect, spreading shrub that is endemic to the Warrumbungles in New South Wales. It has oblong to elliptical leaves with star-shaped hairs, especially on the lower surface, and white flowers arranged in small groups in leaf axils and on the ends of branchlets, the back of the petals densely covered with white, yellow or brown, woolly star-shaped hairs.

Description
The leaves are covered with white to brownish, woolly, star-shaped hairs, usually paler and more densely covered on the lower surface. Flowering occurs in spring.

Taxonomy
This species was first formally described in 1825 by French botanist Antoine Laurent de Jussieu, who gave it the name Phebalium hexapetalum. In 1917, George Claridge Druce changed the name to Asterolasia hexapetala. The name originates from the Ancient Greek words; aster, lasios, and hexapetala, meaning star, hairy (referring to hairs on the leaves), and six-petals.

Distribution and habitat
This asterolasia is only found in the Warrumbungle Ranges where it mainly grows along watercourses in forest and woodland.

Use in horticulture
Asterolasoa hexapetala prefers a moist, well drained and lightly shaded situation. Established plants are able to cope with dry periods. Plants may be propagated by cuttings or from seed, with some difficulty.

References

hexapetala
Flora of New South Wales
Sapindales of Australia
Taxa named by George Claridge Druce